Nicollet Mall is a twelve-block portion of Nicollet Avenue running through downtown Minneapolis, Minnesota, United States. It is the shopping and dining district of the city, and also a pedestrian mall and transit mall. Along with Hennepin Avenue to the west, Nicollet Mall forms the cultural and commercial center of Minneapolis.

Several notable Minneapolis buildings line the Mall, notably the IDS Center, the former Dayton's flagship store, Orchestra Hall, and the Minneapolis Central Library. Minneapolis CBS Station WCCO-TV broadcasts from studios and offices on the south end of the Mall. Several major companies have their headquarters along the Mall, including Target Corporation and US Bank. On Thursdays during the summer, the Nicollet Mall hosts a farmers' market while in the winter the Holidazzle Parade, now entitled "Holidazzle Village", are hosted in the Mall.

History
By the beginning of the 20th century, Nicollet Avenue had defined itself as the city's primary shopping street, as department stores such as G.W. Hale Dry Goods Co. (opening 1867), Donaldson's (1881), and Dayton's (1902) all opened on this stretch. Elizabeth Quinlan, the first woman clothing buyer in the country, opened her store in the Young–Quinlan Building, also on Nicollet.

The first commercial district in Minneapolis centered on the intersection of Nicollet and Hennepin Avenues, an area known as Bridge Square and later the Gateway District. As the city grew and the area became more congested, businesses started moving south from Washington Avenue. When Bridge Square arose in 1906, residents bought hay, dry goods, and supplies at the city market and small stores on Hennepin and Nicollet. Gateway Park replaced the Square in 1913, a green center with a classical pavilion, but was later razed in 1953. Until demolition began in 1959, most of Gateway District remained: a notorious skid row, two parks, large commercial buildings, and hundreds of businesses. The district was seen as suffering from social problems due to the number of flophouses, pawnshops, burlesque theaters, and bars in addition to a high crime rate.

With hopes to solve these problems, city officials began ordering improvements on the area in the 1950s, culminating in the Gateway Center Urban Renewal project, which was approved in 1958 by unanimous City Council vote. Demolition began in 1959. Simultaneously, American shopping habits had begun changing in the mid-20th century, resulting in shopping centers moving to the suburbs. Southdale Center, the nation's first modern enclosed shopping mall, opened in neighboring Edina in 1956. In response, several efforts were undertaken in order to help downtown compete for retail. One was the construction of the renowned skyway system; the second was the creation of Nicollet Mall.

In 1962 the Downtown Council adopted a plan for the mall that was approved by the Minneapolis City Council. The project began construction in 1967 and complete on November 1967 at a cost of $3.875 million. The mall was originally an eight block, 3,200 feet, stretch of Nicollet Avenue that was converted into a curving, tree-lined mall closed to automobile traffic, with an 80-foot right-of-way. The mall was later renovated in 1990 with parts of the underground portion being rebuilt at a cost of $22 million. The original mall had a curvilinear "S" curve alignment with a road width of 24 feet, while the renovated mall has a "C" curve alignment. The 1967 design was done by Lawrence Halprin Associates, while the 1990 redesign was done by BRW, Inc.

The summer of 2015 started a two-year, $50-million renovation of the mall. The improvements will add much more green space, pedestrian amenities and connectivity to surroundings.

Nicollet Mall is known as the first transit mall and pedestrian mall in the United States, and it inspired the creation of such corridors in other cities, including Portland, Oregon and Denver, Colorado. Civic and business leaders, including the Dayton Company and downtown Minneapolis business owners, were instrumental in this transition.

In popular culture

The mall was featured in The Mighty Ducks when the team goes rollerblading.

The tam o'shanter cap toss by television character Mary Richards (Mary T. Moore) in the opening credits of The Mary Tyler Moore Show was filmed on Nicollet Mall, in front of what was then the flagship Donaldson's department store. In 1999, Entertainment Weekly named this scene the second greatest moment of television history. The Mall was also the setting of numerous location shots during the run of The Mary Tyler Moore Show.

In May 2002, a bronze sculpture of Moore's character, created by Gwen Gillen and commissioned by TV Land, was dedicated at the corner of 7th Street and Nicollet Mall. Gillen's design was chosen from a group of 21 sculptors who submitted applications for the sculpture.

Today
The Dayton's department store at 7th & Nicollet was renamed Marshall Field's in 2001, and then Macy's in 2006. It closed in 2017 and is being renovated as an indoor shopping mall, to open in 2020. In late 2019, the original Dayton's signage, removed after the Marshall Field's rename in 2001, was restored to its original place. The corporate descendant of Dayton's, Target Corporation, has a large presence on the Mall, with both their corporate headquarters at 10th Street and a two-level retail store at 9th.

There is Saks Fifth Avenue Off 5th which was converted from the only Saks Fifth Avenue store in the Twin Cities upon its closing in 2004. It is one of the largest Saks Off 5th stores in the United States. National retailers and local boutiques cluster around several locations, namely the Crystal Court, Minneapolis City Center and Gaviidae Common located on the Mall, although most of these buildings are empty on weekends and close by 8 pm on weekdays. City Center has a handful of shops like GNC and Hallmark. Recently Brooks Brothers reopened on the second floor of City Center after closing its store in Mall of America.

Over the years, Nicollet Mall has seen the closing of several national clothing brands, including Polo Ralph Lauren and Cole Haan, which was also its only store in the Twin Cities. Cole Haan reopened at the Galleria Edina. Fewer than ten stores of that kind still remain, including Gap, Banana Republic, Men's Wearhouse, located on the skyway level of Macy's and aforementioned Brooks Brothers. Other shops are either local boutiques or specialty stores. The department stores  Macy's and Saks Fifth Avenue Outlet are located on the mall. Neiman Marcus had a store on the Mall until it closed in 2013. The Macy's downtown, was the division headquarters of Macy's North from 2006 to 2008 before it was integrated into Macy's East headquartered in New York City. Since 2000, the century-old local menswear store Hubert White has resided inside the IDS Center, selling upscale men's clothing, mainly by Ermenegildo Zegna.

In addition to Target Corporation, Fortune 500 companies U.S. Bancorp and Xcel Energy also have their headquarters on Nicollet, while WCCO-TV (CBS Channel 4) broadcasts from studios on the south end of the Mall, including a 'window to the world' news studio on the first floor of their facility.

As a transit mall and pedestrian mall, Nicollet Mall is served by many Metro Transit buses, including several high frequency routes. Aside from buses and Metro Mobility vehicles, only bicycles, pedi-cabs and emergency vehicles are allowed on the two-lane street.

Light rail service connects at Nicollet Mall station at 5th Street, providing access to the Metro Blue Line and Green Line. The Blue Line, opened June 2004, connects to the airport and Mall of America in Bloomington. The Green Line, opened June 2014, connects to the University of Minnesota and downtown Saint Paul. Bus rapid transit service connects at 7th-8th Street & Nicollet station, providing access to the METRO C Line. The C Line, opened June 2019, connects to Brooklyn Center. The D Line, expected to be open late 2022, will also serve the station, connecting Brooklyn Center and the Mall of America. Local Routes 10 and 18 provide a free trips along Nicollet Mall from the Minneapolis Convention Center to the Washington Avenue.

The Loring Greenway links the south end of the Mall to nearby Loring Park.

On August 26, 2020, some Nicollet Mall stores, including Target, Saks Off 5th and Nordstrom Rack were looted after a false report that a homicide suspect, who was revealed on video to have killed himself, was shot and killed by Minneapolis police near Nicollet Mall. The Mall's Sushi Train, The Devil's Advocate, Brit's Pub, and Caribou Coffee also suffered property damage and some looting. However, only Brit's Pub experienced a fire, which was extinguished before it could cause large-scale property damage.

Holidazzle Parades
The Holidazzle Parades were a series of evening parades on Nicollet Mall in downtown Minneapolis. The parades were held from the day after Thanksgiving until a couple days before Christmas. The event started in the early 1990s to increase business for downtown stores.

Macy's, sponsor of the Macy's Thanksgiving Day Parade in New York City and the Celebrate the Season Parade in Pittsburgh, was a sponsor, as was Minneapolis–based Target.

In 2013, organizers announced the parades would be discontinued in favor of a new German-style Christmas market called "Holidazzle Village". Located on Nicollet Mall at Peavey Plaza during its first two years, the village features live music, fireworks and local and international vendors. It moved in 2015 to Loring Park and runs during a period between Thanksgiving and Christmas. No parade is planned in 2020 caused by the COVID-19 pandemic.

A fictionalized version of the parade appeared in the 1996 Arnold Schwarzenegger film Jingle All The Way. The parade event in the movie was called the "Wintertainment Parade," was shown occurring during the day instead of at night, and was not shot in Minneapolis, although much of the film was shot locally.

See also
 List of shopping streets and districts by city

References

External links

 Hennepin County Library History of Minneapolis
 Nicollet Mall Public Art
 Holidazzle Parades official Web site

Shopping districts and streets in the United States
Buildings and structures in Minneapolis
Economy of Minneapolis
Pedestrian malls in the United States
Streets in Minneapolis
Tourist attractions in Minneapolis